Dimitar (Macedonian: Димитар) is a South Slavic masculine given name. It is widely found in Bulgaria and North Macedonia. Dimitar is derived from Saint Demetrius (280–306), alternate form of Demetrius. Containing the Proto Indo-European language mater "mother", it is rooted in the Greek goddess Earth mother Demeter.

The most common short for Dimitar is Mitko, while people with the name Dimitar are informally called also Mite, Mito, Dimo, Dimi, Dimcho, Dimko, Dimka, Dime.

Dimitar Agura (1849–1911), Bulgarian historian, professor of history at Sofia University and rector of the university
Dimitar Andonovski (born 1985), Ethnic Macedonian singer
Dimitar Avramovski–Pandilov (1899–1963), ethnic Macedonian painter
Dimitar Berbatov (born 1981), Bulgarian footballer
Dimitar Blagoev (1856–1924), Bulgarian political leader, the founder of Bulgarian socialism
Dimitar Bosnov (born 1933), defender for PFC Cherno More Varna from 1955 to 1970
Dimitar Buynozov (1935–1995), Bulgarian actor
Dimitar Dimitrov (defender) (born 1989), Bulgarian footballer
Dimitar Dimitrov (football manager) (born 1959), Bulgarian football coach and manager of FC Amkar Perm
Dimitar Dimitrov (Republic of Macedonia) (born 1937), philosopher, writer, journalist, and diplomat from the Republic of Macedonia
Dimitar Dimitrov (volleyball player) (born 1952), Bulgarian former volleyball player
Dimitar Dimov (1909–1966), Bulgarian dramatist, novelist, and veterinary surgeon
Dimitar Dobrev (born 1931), former Greco-Roman wrestler from Bulgaria
Dimitar Furnadjiev, Bulgarian cellist
Dimitar Ganev (1898–1964), Bulgarian communist politician
Dimitar Grekov (1847–1901), Bulgarian liberal politician who also served as Prime Minister
Dimitar Iliev (footballer born 1988), Bulgarian football forward
Dimitar Iliev (footballer born 1986), Bulgarian football defender
Dimitar Iliev Popov (born 1927), leading Bulgarian judge and Prime Minister
Dimitar Ilievski-Murato (1953–1989), alpinist from the Republic of Macedonia
Dimitar Inkiow (1932–2006), Bulgarian writer
Dimitar Isakov (born 1924), retired Bulgarian football player
Dimitar Ivankov (born 1975), Bulgarian football player
Dimitar Ivanov Makriev (born 1984), Bulgarian footballer
Dimitar Ivanov Popov (1894–1975), Bulgarian organic chemist and an academician of the Bulgarian Academy of Sciences
Dimitar Khlebarov (born 1934), retired pole vaulter from Bulgaria
Dimitar Koemdzhiev (born 1978), Bulgarian footballer
Dimitar Kondovski (1927–1993), Macedonian painter
Dimitar Nakov (born 1980), Bulgarian footballer
Dimitar Nenov (1901–1953), Bulgarian classical pianist, composer, music pedagogue and architect
Dimitar Obshti, 19th-century Bulgarian revolutionary
Dimitar Paskov, the chemist who led the Sopharma team that extracted Nivalin (Galantamine) for first time
Dimitar Penev (born 1945), Bulgarian football coach and former player
Dimitar Peshev (1894–1973), the Deputy Speaker of the National Assembly of Bulgaria and Minister of Justice during World War II
Dimitar Petkov (1856–1907), leading member of the Bulgarian People's Liberal Party; Prime Minister (assassinated)
Dimitar Petkov (footballer) (born 1987), Bulgarian footballer
Dimitar Popgeorgiev (1840–1907), Bulgarian revolutionary from Macedonia
Dimitar Popov (born 1970), Bulgarian football (soccer) player in goalkeeper role
Dimitar Rangelov (born 1983), Bulgarian football striker
Dimitar Rizov, Bulgarian revolutionary, publicist, politician, journalist and diplomat
Dimitar Shtilianov (born 1976), boxer from Bulgaria
Dimitar Spisarevski (1916–1943), Bulgarian fighter pilot in World War II
Dimitar Stanchov (1863–1940), Bulgarian politician, acting Prime Minister in 1907
Dimitar Stoyanov (politician) (born 1983), Bulgarian and EU politician
Dimitar Talev (1898–1966), Bulgarian writer and journalist
Dimitar Telkiyski (born 1977), Bulgarian football player
Dimitar Vlahov (1878–1953), revolutionary from the region of Macedonia
Dimitar Vodenicharov (born 1987), Bulgarian football striker
Dimitar Yakimov (born 1941), one of the most respected players of the Bulgarian football team CSKA Sofia
Dimitar Zlatanov (born 1948), former Bulgarian volleyball player; won the silver medal at the 1980 Summer Olympics
Dimitar Zlatarev, Bulgarian terrorist
Dimitar Zograf (1796–1860), 19th-century Bulgarian painter known for his icons
Hadzhi Dimitar (1840–1868), one of the most prominent Bulgarian revolutionary workers for the Liberation of Bulgaria from Ottoman rule

See also
Hadzhi Dimitar Stadium, multi-purpose stadium in Sliven, Bulgaria

References

Bulgarian masculine given names